Ebenezer Chapel is a Strict Baptist place of worship in the hamlet of Broad Oak, part of the parish of Heathfield in the English county of East Sussex. The chapel was built in 1864.

An Independent Baptist congregation was founded here in 1835 by a Horsham-based preacher. The present chapel is aligned to the Gospel Standard movement and was built in 1864. It is timber-framed, partly weatherboarded and rendered, and has been extended several times. Above the entrance there is a gable.

The chapel is licensed for worship in accordance with the Places of Worship Registration Act 1855 and has the registration number 9014.

See also
List of current places of worship in Wealden
List of Strict Baptist churches

References

Bibliography

External links
 The chapel on www.roughwood.net

Churches completed in 1864
19th-century Baptist churches
Strict Baptist chapels
19th-century churches in the United Kingdom
Baptist churches in East Sussex